Sangsaeng (相生) means mutual life-giving, and is one of the key philosophical principles of Jeungism, a spiritual movement from Korea dedicated to the well-being of all people. In English terms, "win-win" maybe the correct translation. Sang(相) means "mutual" or "together" and Saeng(生) means "live" or "survive". Because of its literal meaning, mutual life-giving or win-win, this term is used by Korean politicians very often.

Importance
However, just a simple, literal translation of mutual life-giving or win-win is not all of its meaning. Before understanding Sangsaeng further, it is recommended that you understand Cosmic year because the meaning of Sangsaeng can be explained in more detail in the context of Cosmic year. 

Sangsaeng is necessary because governing principles in Early Heaven (cosmic spring, summer) and Later Heaven (cosmic autumn, winter) are different. In Early Heaven, the principle of Sanggeuk(相克 : mutual conflict) governs all lives. Therefore, all lives in the world are suffering even though they do not want. However, in Later Heaven, the principle of Sangsaeng(相生 : mutual life-giving) governs all lives in the world.

Application
In daily life, mutual life-giving is to work for the well-being of others, and at the time of gaebyeok, the focus of mutual life-giving will be to save life. Sharing teachings with others is also an act of mutual life-giving. Throughout history people have prospered at the expense of others, but in Jeungic philosophy, from now on people can only prosper by benefiting others.

Quote from Dojeon
Our work is the practice of helping others do well. After others prosper, we need only to take what remains and our work will be accomplished.
Dojeon 2:15:8

Now that the whole world is being united into one home, all people become one family in which harmony abounds 8 and saving life becomes a virtue.
Dojeon 2:16:7

See also
 Boeun (Offering Gratitude and Repayment) 報恩
 Cosmic Year
 Shao Yung
 Dojang Dao center 道場
 Dojeon Sacred text of Jeung San Do 道典
 Gaebyeok 
 Haewon (Resolution of Bitterness and Grief) 解怨
 Jeung San Do
 Sangjenim 上帝
 Tae Eul Ju mantra 太乙呪
 Taemonim 太母
 Wonsibanbon (Returning to the Origin) 原始反本

Jeung San Do